Yu Shaoteng (Pinyin: Yú Shǎoténg; born March 26, 1979, in Guangzhou, Guangdong) is a Chinese chess Grandmaster, and is the personal trainer of chess prodigy Hou Yifan. He took part in the FIDE World Chess Championship 2002, but was knocked out in the first round by Zhang Zhong. In 2004, he became China's 17th Grandmaster at the age of 25.

Grandmaster title
He obtained four GM norms before being awarded the GM title. They were at:

In February 2002, 2nd Trignac Open International; score 7/9.
In March 2002, 6th Open Anibal in Linares; score 7/10.
In July 2004, 2nd ASEAN Masters GM in Bangkok; score 6.5/10.
In August 2004, 3rd ASEAN Masters GM in Bangkok; score 6/10.

National team
Yu has competed in the China national chess team in the Chess Olympiad once at the 33rd Chess Olympiad in 1998 (games played 4: +1, =2, -1), and twice at the Asian Team Chess Championships (1999–2003) (games played 7: +2, =2, -3).

See also
Chess in China

References

External links

Elo rating and ranking table

1979 births
Living people
Chess grandmasters
Chess Olympiad competitors
Chess players from Guangzhou